Jan Filip may refer to:

Jan Filip (footballer) (born 1994), Czech footballer
Jan Filip (handballer) (born 1973), Czech handballer
Jan Filip (historian) (1900–1981), Czech prehistorian and archaeologist
Jan Filip (priest) (1911–1971), Czech Esperantist and author